Arnaldo Roche Rabell (December 5, 1955 – November 17, 2018) was a Puerto Rican painter, described as "one of the most important artists of the neo-expressionist movement".

Born in San Juan, Puerto Rico. He was educated at the Luchetti School of Art in San Juan, Puerto Rico, later studying architecture at the University of Puerto Rico before graduating with an MFA at the Art Institute of Chicago in 1984.

Roche Rabell became known for his textured, sensual neo-expressionist paintings which often dealt with themes of memory, political turbulence, and consciousness, as well as the medium of painting itself. He developed a technique of rubbing or scratching away the layers of paint to create his images.

Roche Rabell's work can be found in the permanent collections of the Miami Museum of Art, and the Museum of Contemporary Art in San Juan and the Metropolitan Museum of Art in New York.

Roche Rabell died on November 17, 2018 in San Juan, Puerto Rico, after suffering from lung cancer.

References 

1955 births
2018 deaths
Puerto Rican painters
People from San Juan, Puerto Rico
School of the Art Institute of Chicago alumni
Neo-expressionist artists